Stephensia ussuriella is a moth in the family Elachistidae. It was described by Sinev in 1992. It is found in the Russian Far East.

References

Moths described in 1992
Elachistidae
Moths of Asia